In Hinduism, the goddess Tara is the second of the Dasa (ten) Mahavidyas or "Great Wisdom goddesses", and is a form of Adishakti, the tantric manifestation of Parvati. Her most famous centre of worship is the temple and the cremation ground of Tarapith in West Bengal, India. Her three most famous forms are Ekajaṭā, Ugratara, and Nīlasarasvatī (Neelasaraswati or Neela Saraswati or Neelsaraswati).

Legends and theology
The commonly known origin of Tara is from the 17th chapter of the Rudrayāmala which describes the initial unsuccessful attempts of the brahminical sage Vasiṣṭha in the worship of the deity (his initial locations are usually placed by the ocean or in Kāmākhyā according to the Brahmayāmala) and the subsequent meeting of Vishnu in the form of Buddha in the region of Mahācīna and his eventual success by the means of kaula rites which employ the five makāras of Shaakta kaula tantra. She is also described as the form of the Atharvaveda (atharvavedaśākhinī). Her Bhairava is described as Akṣobhya in the Todala tantra because he drank the deadly halāhala poison without agitation (a-kṣobha). According to the Svatantra Tantra, Tara protects her devotees from difficult (ugra) dangers and so she is also known as Ugratārā. The goddess is all-pervading and also manifests on Earth. A devotee who attains success in her mantra is said to get the ability to create poems, gain a complete understanding of all the Shastras and attain moksha.

Historical origin 

The system of Tara is probably an amalgamation of the systems of Bhīmā or Nīlā near Oḍḍiyāna which has Buddhist and probably Taoist influence. The syncreticism between Śaivism and Buddhist cults created a congenial atmosphere for the formation of the traditions of Tārā, both Hindu and Buddhist. Her pleasant forms were popular amongst the Buddhists, while the cult of Bhīmā-Ekajaṭā was popular mainly amongst the Śaivas, from whom it merged into Vajrayana Buddhism until it was reintroduced by Vasiṣtha from Mahācīna, which is identified on the basis of the Śaktisaṅgamatantra as a small geographical entity between Mt. Kailasa, South East of the lake Manasarovar and near Lake Rakshas Tal, or alternatively located somewhere in Central Asia.  Some of the forms of the deity like Mahchācīnakrama-Tara, also known as Ugra-Tara, are worshipped in both Hindu and Buddhist systems. Her sādhanā described by Śāśvatavajra, which was included in the Buddhist collection of sadhanas called the Sādhanāśatapañcāśikā, which was incorporated in the Phetkarīya tantra and was quoted in tantric manuals like the Bṛhat Tantrasāra of Kṛṣṇānanda Agamavāgīśa with some aspects of the iconography and the subsequent interpretations differing between the Hindu and Buddhist systems.

The Śaktisaṅgama tantra notes that her sādhanā via Cīnācāra is performed in two ways, through sakalacīnācāra and niṣkalacīnācār a, with the sakala form being prevalent in Buddhist modes of worship and the Niṣkala form being prevalent amongst brahminical modes of worship.

In the Puranas 
Tara is mentioned in the Devi-Bhagavata Purana, where it is said that her favourite place is Cīna and also that Svarocisha Manu worshipped the deity on the banks of the Kalindi (Yamuna). She is also attested in the Kalika Purana'''s 61st, 79th and 80th chapter. She is often described in these chapters as a fierce deity, holding kartrī (knife), khaḍga (sword), chamara (Fly-whisk) or indivara (lotus) and a single matted braid over her head. She is dark in complexion, tall, with a bulging belly, wears tiger pelts, with her left foot on the chest of a corpse and her right foot placed on a lion or between the thighs of the corpse. She has a terrifying laugh and is fearful. The Goddess Tīkṣṇakāntā, who is also considered a form of Tara in the Kalika Purana also is dark with a single braid (ekajaṭā) and is pot-bellied.

 Tantric sources of Worship 
The deity's scriptural sources of tantric worship include the Tārātantra, the Brahmayāmala, the Rudrayāmala, the Nīlatantra/Bṛhannīlatantra, the Tārātantra, the Nīlasarasvatītantra and various tantric compendia like the Tantrasara of Agamavagisha and the Prāṇatoṣiṇī, the Tārābhaktisudhārṇava of Narasiṃha Thakkura and the Tārārahasya of Brahmānanda Giri. These sources of worship are often consulted in tantric lineages that practice the worship of Tara.

Iconography

Kali and Tara are similar in appearance. They both are described as standing upon a supine corpse sometimes identified with Shiva. However, while Kali is described as black, Tara is described as blue. Both wear minimal clothing, however Tara wears a tiger-skin skirt, while Kali wears only a girdle of severed human arms. Both wear a garland of severed human heads. Both have a lolling tongue, and blood oozes from their mouths. Their appearances are so strikingly similar that it is easy to mistake one for the other. Tara is shown standing in the pratyalidha stance (in which the left foot is forward). Her Bhairava (consort) is Akshobhya, a form of Shiva who is in the form of a naga (serpent) coiled around her matted hair. She wears a crown made of 5 skulls connected with plates of bone. Eight forms of Tara are attested in the Māyātantra quoted in the tantric compendium Tantrasāra'' and the names are Ekajaṭa, Ugra-Tara, Mahogra, Kameshvari-Tara, Chamunda, Nila-Sarasvati (Neelasaraswati or 'Blue Saraswati'), Vajra-Tara and Bhadrakali.

Famous modern devotees 
In Bengal, the literary productions of Sadhak Ramprasad Sen gave a new phase to the classical secretive worship of Tara, and his devotionalism influenced the image of the deity. She was regarded as a daughter in his songs. Sadhak Bamakhepa also was a famous siddha of Tara in the modern era. These devotees introduced a public devotional dimension to the secretive tantric worship of this deity and emphasised her motherliness.

See also

Tara Devi Temple, Shimla
Bamakhepa
Maa Taratarini Temple
Maa Tarini
Maa Ugra Tara
Tarapith
Mahapeeth Tarapeeth, a Bengali television show about Tara and the origin of Tarapith shrine

Other religions 

 Tara (Buddhism) a Vajrayana Bodhisattva
Ekajati in the Nyingma and Dzongchen schools of Tibetan Buddhism

References

Further reading

External links
 
 Official Tarapith Website
 A Short Biography of Vamaksepa

Hindu goddesses
Mahavidyas
Forms of Parvati